Carpal ligament may refer to:

 Palmar carpal ligament
 Ulnar carpal collateral ligament
 Radial carpal collateral ligament
 Radiate carpal ligament
 Extensor retinaculum of the hand, also known as dorsal carpal ligament
 Flexor retinaculum of the hand, also known as transverse carpal ligament